Misconduct is a 2016 American thriller film directed by Shintaro Shimosawa in his directorial debut and written by Simon Boyes and Adam Mason. The film stars Josh Duhamel, Alice Eve, Malin Åkerman, Byung-hun Lee, Julia Stiles, Glen Powell, with Al Pacino and Anthony Hopkins. The film was released in a limited release and through video on demand on February 5, 2016, by Lionsgate Premiere.

Plot
Arthur Denning (Hopkins) is the owner of a major pharmaceutical firm. He is very controlling of his girlfriend Emily Hynes (Åkerman), and she is physically intimidated by his security guards. She is abducted, and Denning is sent photos of her bruised face. He is ordered to go to an art gallery with the ransom. When a man approaches him, Denning attacks him, only to find out later that he was the gallery owner.

Before her abduction, Hynes reaches out to her ex-boyfriend Ben Cahill (Duhamel). Over drinks, she hints at Denning's abuse and some dirt she has on him. Back at her apartment, she shows Cahill files that she has stolen from Denning's laptop that reveal his criminal behavior during drug trials. She attempts to seduce Cahill. Later, she convinces a stranger to beat her up for the photo that she sends to Denning.

Cahill uses the information from Hynes to pitch a class action lawsuit to his boss Charles Abrams (Pacino) which he then files as a class action suit against Denning. Later that evening, Cahill is stunned to find Hynes dead in her apartment. With a bottle of pills in her hand, and a lethal cocktail of drugs in her system, her death is suspicious but possibly just a suicide. Cahill decides to leave the scene without reporting it to the police and tries to cover his tracks secretly telling only his wife about it.

At a preliminary deposition to the lawsuit, Denning suddenly settles the suit for $400 million, provided that the stolen documents are returned to him.  A short time later, Hynes body turns up in Cahill's home. Convinced he is being framed, he then confronts Denning who is amused at Cahill's passion, but assures him that he had nothing to do with it.

A hitman kidnaps Cahill and his wife Charlotte (Eve). Cahill manages to overpower and kill him. When he inspects the hitman's files he realizes that the villain of the piece is actually his boss. Abrams has been colluding with Denning for years, deliberately losing all the cases his clients brought against the pharmaceutical magnate. The settlement was all just an elaborate way of protecting Denning from criminal liability.

Cahill submits the hitman's files to the police who arrest Abrams. Before he can be taken into custody, Abrams grabs an officer's gun and commits suicide.

As Cahill packs for a move to a new house, he notices that some of his wife's clothing smells like Hynes' perfume. He asks her what happened between the two of them. Charlotte confesses that she confronted Hynes about her involvement with her husband. They had an argument in which Charlotte hit Hynes, causing her to fall and hit her head. Though Charlotte is a nurse, she did not help her and staged the scene for the police.

Cast
 Josh Duhamel as Ben Cahill
 Alice Eve as Charlotte Cahill
 Malin Åkerman as Emily Hynes
 Al Pacino as Charles Abrams
 Anthony Hopkins as Arthur Denning
 Julia Stiles as Jane Clemente
 Byung-hun Lee as The Accountant
 Glen Powell as Doug Fields
 Skye P. Marshall as Hatty
 Gregory Alan Williams as Richard Hill
 Ara Gelici as Joseph Andolini
 Jason Gibson as Graham
 Chris Marquette as Giffords
 Sara Fletcher as 911 Operator

Production
On February 6, 2015, Hopkins, Pacino, Dan Stevens, Åkerman, and Lee joined the cast of the film, then titled Beyond Deceit. On March 10, 2015, Duhamel and Eve joined the cast.

Filming
Principal photography began on March 20, 2015 in New Orleans, Louisiana.

Release
On April 1, 2015, Lionsgate acquired distribution rights to the film through their Lionsgate Premiere label. The film was released in a limited release and through video on demand on February 5, 2016.

It received a limited theatrical release in the UK through Reel Cinemas in June 2016, grossing just £97 (£19.40 per screen) on its opening weekend.

Critical response
Misconduct received negative reviews from film critics. It holds a 7% "Rotten" rating on review aggregator website Rotten Tomatoes, based on 29 reviews, with an average rating of 2.5/10. On Metacritic, the film holds a rating of 24 out of 100, based on 10 critics, indicating "generally unfavorable reviews".

Joe Leydon of Variety gave the film a negative review, writing: "Misconduct, a flagrantly derivative but modestly diverting drama of the sort that once claimed acres of shelf space at Blockbuster outlets. Anthony Hopkins and Al Pacino saunter through the proceedings while picking up easy paychecks and providing marquee allure, but it’s up to the top-billed Josh Duhamel to do most of the heavy lifting in this neo-noir scenario about an ambitious lawyer who bends the rules during litigation against a corrupt pharmaceutical tycoon, only to become entangled in at least two conspiracies.  Limited theatrical play will be a mere formality, as is usually the case for such VOD-ready fare."

Frank Scheck of The Hollywood Reporter also gave the film a negative review, writing: "Although one of its central characters is a ruthless, unscrupulous pharmaceutical company executive, Misconduct, sadly, is not a biopic about Martin Shkreli. Rather, it's the sort of by-the-numbers, forgettable thriller, starring actors whose marquee days are behind them, that is routinely dumped in theaters and on VOD. Showcased here are Anthony Hopkins and Al Pacino, reminding us that the 1970s and 1980s were a long time ago."

The film was also awarded The Barry L. Bumstead Award (For a movie that cost a lot and lost a lot) at the 37th Golden Raspberry Awards.

References

External links
 
 
 

2016 films
2016 thriller drama films
American thriller drama films
Films about lawyers
Films shot in New Orleans
Mandate Pictures films
Lionsgate films
Films scored by Federico Jusid
2016 directorial debut films
2016 drama films
2010s English-language films
2010s American films